Athletics at the 2005 Games of the Small States of Europe were held at the Estadi Comunal in Andorra la Vella, Andorra between 30 May – 4 June.

The event took place at altitude which is believed to have a positive effect on the performance in some events.

Medal summary

Men

Women

Men's results

100 metres

Heats – May 31Wind:Heat 1: -1.2 m/s, Heat 2: 0.0 m/s

Final – May 31Wind:+0.3 m/s

200 metres
June 4Wind: -2.2 m/s

400 metres

Heats – May 31

Final – June 2

800 metres
May 31

1500 metres
June 4

5000 metres
June 4

10,000 metres
May 31

110 metres hurdles

Heats – June 2Wind:Heat 1: -3.5 m/s, Heat 2: -3.2 m/s

Final – June 4Wind:-3.8 m/s

400 metres hurdles
June 2

3000 metres steeplechase
June 2

4 x 100 metres relay
Heats – June 2

Final – June 4

4 x 400 metres relay
June 4

High jump
June 2

Pole vault
May 31

Long jump
June 2

Triple jump
June 4

Shot put
June 2

Discus throw
May 31

Javelin throw
June 4

Women's results

100 metres

Heats – May 31Wind:Heat 1: 0.0 m/s, Heat 2: +1.7 m/s

Final – May 31Wind:+0.1 m/s

200 metres

Heats – June 2Wind:Heat 1: -3.8 m/s, Heat 2: -4.1 m/s

Final – June 4Wind:-3.3 m/s

400 metres

Heats – May 31

Final – June 2

800 metres
May 31

1500 metres
June 2

5000 metres
May 31

10,000 metres
June 4

100 metres hurdles
June 4Wind: -1.0 m/s

4 x 100 metres relay
June 4

4 x 400 metres relay
June 4

High jump
June 4

Pole vault
June 2

Long jump
June 2

Long jump
May 31

Shot put
May 31

Discus throw
June 4

Hammer throw
June 2

Javelin throw
June 2

Medal table

Participating nations

 (24) (Host team)
 (45)
 (21)
 (3)
 (27)
 (18)
 (15)
 (11)

References
Event winners at GBR Athletics
Full results (archived)

Games of the Small States of Europe Athletics
Athletics
2005
2005 Games of the Small States of Europe Athletics